Chernovskoye is a rural locality (a selo) and the administrative center of Chernovskoye Rural Settlement, Bolshesosnovsky District, Perm Krai, Russia. The population was 1,806 as of 2010. There are 25 streets.

Geography 
Chernovskoye is located 22 km south of Bolshaya Sosnova (the district's administrative centre) by road. Osinovka is the nearest rural locality.

References 

Rural localities in Bolshesosnovsky District